Adam Žilák (born 7 December 1991) is a Slovak footballer who plays for TJ Tatran Oravské Veselé.

On 16 July 2009, Žilák made his first team debut against Dacia Chişinău at the 2009–10 UEFA Europa League aged 17.

References

External links
MŠK Žilina profile
Corgoň Liga profile

1991 births
Living people
Sportspeople from Martin, Slovakia
Association football midfielders
Slovak footballers
MŠK Žilina players
FC ViOn Zlaté Moravce players
FK Železiarne Podbrezová players
FK Iskra Borčice players
Slovak Super Liga players